Mount Lockhart is a prominent northerly projection from the main massif of the Fosdick Mountains  northeast of Mount Avers, in the Ford Ranges of Marie Byrd Land, Antarctica. It was discovered by the Byrd Antarctic Expedition on a flight on December 5, 1929, and was named for Ernest Earl Lockhart, a physiologist at West Base of the United States Antarctic Service Expedition and a member of the biological party which visited this area in 1940.

Further reading 
 Antarctic Journal of the United States, Volumes 25-26, PP 4, 5

References 

 Mount Lockhart

Mountains of Marie Byrd Land